EHOME is a Chinese Dota 2 team. The team was founded in 2004 which consist of Warcraft III and Counter-Strike teams. The Dota division was started in 2007. EHOME is one of the most successful Dota teams of all time. EHOME  disbanded after The International 2012 but rebuilt in 2015. Now, EHOME is one of the highest ranked Dota 2 teams in China.

Roster

Tournament results
 2nd — The International 2011
9-12th — Dota 2 Asia Championships
 5-6th — The International 2015
 4th — Frankfurt Major 2015
 9-12th — Shanghai Major 2016
 5-6th — The International 2016
 1st  — The Bucharest Minor

References

2004 establishments in China
Dota teams
Esports teams based in China
Defunct and inactive Overwatch teams
Esports teams established in 2004
Counter-Strike teams
EHOME players
Defunct and inactive League of Legends teams